This was the first edition of the tournament.

Pablo Carreño won the title, defeating Daniel Muñoz de la Nava in the final 7–6(7–2), 2–6, 6–2.

Seeds

Draw

Finals

Top half

Bottom half

References
 Main Draw
 Qualifying Draw

Morocco - Mohammedia - Singles
2014 - Singles
Mohammedia - Singles